Manfred Bischoff (born 22 April 1942) is a German businessman who has served as chairman of the supervisory boards of Daimler AG and Mercedes-Benz.

Early life 
Bischoff was born on 22 April 1942 in Calw, Germany. He earned a degree in Economics, and a PhD from Heidelberg University in 1973.

Career 
From 2000 until 2007, Bischoff was chairman of EADS.

He was a member of the Daimler supervisory board since 2006, and its chairman from 2007 to 2015. Upon retirement, he was largely credited with the creation of Airbus and EADS by Airbus chairman Denis Ranque.

Bischoff was expected to be replaced by Dieter Zetsche in 2021 until Bernd Pischetsrieder was chosen as his successor instead.

Other activities

Corporate boards 
 Mercedes-Benz, Member of the Supervisory Board (since 2019)
 SMS Group, Member of the Supervisory Board (-2019
 Airbus, Member of the Board of Directors (-2016)
 Fraport, Member of the Supervisory Board (2002-2012)
 UniCredit, Independent Member of the Board of Directors (2005-2016)
 KPN, Member of the Board of Directors (2003-2013)
 Voith, Member of the Supervisory Board (1999-2014)
 Nortel, Member of the Board of Directors (2004-2009)
 Mitsubishi Motors, Member of the Board of Directors (2000-2004)
 Lagardère Group, Member of the Board of Directors (1998-2005)

Non-profit organizations 
 American Academy in Berlin, Member of the Board of Trustees
 Deutsche Nationalstiftung, Member of the Senate
 Munich Academy of Fine Arts, Member of the Board of Trustees
 Trilateral Commission, Member of the European Group
 Technical University of Munich, Member of the Board of Trustees (since 1999)

Controversy 
In 2007, Bischoff was one of several EADS senior executives who were questioned by French financial regulator AMF as part of an investigation into alleged insider trading. Bischoff was cleared of any wrong-doing by the AMF.

References
 

1942 births
Living people
Heidelberg University alumni
Daimler people
People from Calw
Airbus people
Nortel people
Mitsubishi Motors people